The petit appartement de la reine is a suite of rooms in the Palace of Versailles. These rooms, situated behind the grand appartement de la reine, and which now open onto two interior courtyards, were the private domain of the Queens of France, Maria Theresa of Spain, Marie Leszczyńska, and Marie-Antoinette, as well as of the duchesse de Bourgogne as dauphine.

The rooms in the petit appartement de la reine have been restored to the condition in which they were left when Marie-Antoinette left Versailles on 6 October 1789, and while the rooms are mostly Louis XVI style, some parts are Louis XV style, or Rococo, like the fireplace mantel found in the supplément de la bibliothèque, or the centre table in the cabinet de la Méridienne, as well as the mantel clock in the billiard room.

Marie-Thérèse
At the completion of Le Vau's enveloppe, Marie-Thérèse's private area consisted of suite of five rooms that opened on the southern side of the cour de marbre and onto a small interior courtyard – at the time called the cour de la reine. In these rooms, Marie-Thérèse led her private and family life.  Very little information survived about the décor or the arrangement of these rooms, owing largely to her early death in 1683 (Verlet 1985, p. 253).

The most significant modifications to the petit appartement de la reine were made after the marriage of Louis XIV's grandson, the duc de Bourgogne, with Princess Marie-Adélaïde of Savoy in 1697.  Shortly after the marriage, in 1699, a suite of three rooms was constructed – known as the appartement de nuit du duc de Bourgogne (Verlet 1985, p. 210).  These rooms were created for the conjugal visits of the young duc with his wife.  Consisting of a bedroom, cabinet, and garde-robe, this part of the petit appartement de la reine when constructed in 1699 divided the cour de la reine into the cour de Monseigneur to the west and the cour de Monsieur to the east (Verlet 1985, p. 256).  These rooms also communicated with the appartement du roi and formed part of petit appartement de la reine and were used by the princess until her death in 1712.

Maria Leszczyńska

Under Marie Leszczyńska, the petit appartement de la reine underwent three distinct phases of modification: 1728-1731; 1737–1739; and, 1746-1748.

The 1728-1731 phase resulted in the construction of a chambre des bains (1740 plan #8); the petite galerie (1740 plan #7); and an oratory (1740 plan #6) (Verlet 1985, p. 401).

The 1737-1739 phase saw significant redecoration in the petite galerie with a décor of paneling in green and gold vernis Martin.  At this time, the appartement de nuit du duc de Bourgogne was remodeled for use by the queen with the construction of the grand cabinet intérieur (1740 plan #9) and the arrière cabinet (1740 plan #10), both of which were decorated with intricately carved and painted paneling.  At this time, a number of paintings, most notably by François Boucher and Charles-Antoine Coypel, were displayed in the petit appartement de la reine (Verlet 1985, p. 402)

The 1746-1748 phase saw a redecoration of the petite galerie. During this time it was called alternately cabinet des chinois – owing to the number of chinoiserie designs by the queen, which she had framed and hung in this room – or laboratoire – a laboratory where she pursued her hobbies.  At this time, the oratoire was converted in the cabinet de la Méridienne with new paneling by Jacques Verberckt.   The pièce des bains was redecorated with paneling by the Rousseau brothers and paintings by Charles-Joseph Natoire.  The grand cabinet d’intérieur received new paneling by Verberckt (Jallut, 1969; Pons, 1992; Verlet 1985, p. 402-403).

With the death of Marie Leszczyńska in 1768, the petit appartement de la reine remained vacant until the arrival of the new dauphine, Marie-Antoinette, in 1770.

Marie-Antoinette
The fame of the petit appartement de la reine rests squarely in the hands of the last queen of France during the Ancien Régime.  The restored state of the rooms seen today at Versailles closely replicate the petit appartement de la reine as it appeared during Marie-Antoinette's day (Verlet, 1937).  Modifications of the petit appartement de la reine for Marie-Antoinette began in 1779 (Verlet 1985, p. 585).

Marie-Antoinette ordered her favorite architect, Richard Mique to cover the walls of the petit appartement de la reine with white satin embroidered with floral arabesques, to give a decorative cohesion to the rooms.  The cost of the fabric was 100,000 livres; the hangings were entirely replaced with wood paneling in 1783 (Verlet 1985, p. 586).

In 1781, to commemorate the birth of the first dauphin, Louis XVI commissioned Richard Mique to redecorate the cabinet de la Méridienne (1789 plan #6) (Verlet 1985, p. 586).  It was in this room that Marie-Antoinette would choose the clothing she would wear that day.

In this same year, the bibliothèque – occupying the site of the petite galerie of Marie Leszczyńska – (1789 plan #7) and the supplément de la bibliothèque – occupying the pièce des bains of Maria Leszczyńska – (1789 plan #8), and, additionally, a room for the toilette à l’anglaise a pièce des bains and a salle des bains were arranged, opening on the cour de Monsieur (Verlet 1985, p. 403).

The last major modification to the petit appartement de la reine occurred in 1783, when Marie-Antoinette ordered a complete redecoration of the grand cabinet intérieur.  The costly embroidered hangings were replaced with carved gilt paneling by Richard Mique.  The new décor caused the room to be renamed the cabinet doré (Verlet 1985, p. 586).

Of all the features of the petit appartement de la reine, the so-called secret passage that links the grand appartement de la reine with the appartement du roi is one that has become a legend in the history of Palace of Versailles.  The passage actually dates from the time of Marie-Thérèse, and had always been a suite of service rooms that also served as a private means by which the king and queen could communicate with each other (1740 plan #1-4; 1789 plan #1-4).  It is true, however, that Marie-Antoinette, who was sleeping in the chambre de la reine in the grand appartement de la reine, escaped from the Paris mob on the night of 5/6 October 1789 by using this route. The entrance to the so-called secret passage is through a door located on the west side of the north wall of the chambre de la reine.

Gallery of Images

Notes

Sources

Books

Journals

External links

Palace of Versailles
Rooms